William Clark Norris (born September 20, 1926) was a major general in the United States Air Force who served as commander of the Third Air Force, U.S. Air Forces in Europe (USAFE), with headquarters at Royal Air Force Station Mildenhall, Suffolk, England.

Norris was born in 1926, in Port Jervis, New York. He graduated from Port Jervis High School in 1945, and enlisted in the Army Air Force in February of the same year. He entered pilot training at Goodfellow Air Force Base, Texas, in February 1948, and graduated at Williams Air Force Base, Arizona, in February 1949 with a commission as a second lieutenant.

In 1949 Norris was assigned to the 20th Fighter Group, predecessor of the present-day 20th Tactical Fighter Wing, at Shaw Air Force Base, South Carolina, flying F-84s. In July 1950, he took part with the 20th in the first Atlantic crossing of F-84 aircraft to Manston, England. In December 1950, the 20th deployed back across the Atlantic to Shaw Air Force Base. In March 1951, Norris was assigned to Japan flying F-80C aircraft in the air defense system. In April 1951, he volunteered to fly F-51s in Korea and was assigned to the 39th Fighter-Interceptor Squadron of the 18th Fighter-Bomber Wing. He later became the operations officer. Norris completed 100 combat missions over North Korea.

From 1952 through 1959, he was assigned to the 54th Fighter-Interceptor Squadron, Ellsworth Air Force Base, South Dakota, during which time he served as its operations officer for three years. In January 1959, he was transferred to the 449th Fighter-Interceptor Squadron at Ladd Air Force Base, Alaska, where he later became chief of the Fighter-Operations Branch of the 11th Air Division. He entered the Air Command and Staff College at Maxwell Air Force Base, Alabama, in September 1961 and graduated in June 1962.

Norris then was assigned to the Directorate of Operations, Air Defense Command, at Ent Air Force Base, Colorado. In June 1965, he was transferred to Tyndall Air Force Base, Florida, and served first as chief of the Standardization and Evaluation Division, 4756th Air Defense Wing, and later as commander of the Air Defense Command Fighter-Interceptor Weapons School.

He went to Southeast Asia in November 1966 and served at Takhli Royal Thai Air Force Base, as chief of the Operations Branch, 355th Tactical Fighter Wing. In January 1967, he was assigned as commander of the 333rd Tactical Fighter Squadron, equipped with F-105 aircraft. During this period, he completed 100 combat missions over North Vietnam.

In October 1967, Norris was transferred to the Pentagon as assistant executive officer to the chief of the National Guard Bureau. In August 1968, he returned to the Aerospace Defense Command (formerly Air Defense Command) headquarters as director, Operational Readiness Inspection. He entered the Air War College at Maxwell Air Force Base in August 1970 and graduated in June 1971.

Norris next was assigned to the U.S. Air Forces in Europe (USAFE) at Hahn Air Base, Germany, as vice commander of the 50th Tactical Fighter Wing. He assumed command of the 50th in October 1971. In February 1973, he was promoted to brigadier general and was named commander of the 20th Tactical Fighter Wing at Royal Air Force Station Upper Heyford, England. He assumed duties as deputy chief of staff, plans, USAFE, with headquarters at Ramstein Air Base, Germany, in November 1973, and was appointed USAFE inspector general in July 1974.

In August 1975, Norris became commander of Headquarters Command, U.S. Air Force, with headquarters at Bolling Air Force Base, Washington, D.C. Upon the disestablishment of the command on June 30, 1976, Norris was named commander of the 76th Airlift Division, Andrews Air Force Base, Maryland. He assumed command of Third Air Force on August 1, 1977.

He is a command pilot and has been current in 11 different fighter aircraft. His military decorations and awards include the Air Force Cross, Distinguished Service Medal, Silver Star, Distinguished Flying Cross with oak leaf cluster, Bronze Star Medal, Meritorious Service Medal, Air Medal with 12 oak leaf clusters, Air Force Commendation Medal, and Army Commendation Medal.

He was promoted to the grade of major general February 6, 1976, with date of rank June 13, 1973. He retired on July 1, 1980.

References

1926 births
Living people
United States Air Force generals
United States Air Force personnel of the Korean War
American expatriates in Thailand
United States Air Force personnel of the Vietnam War
People from Port Jervis, New York
Military personnel from New York (state)
Air War College alumni
Recipients of the Air Force Cross (United States)
Recipients of the Silver Star
Recipients of the Distinguished Service Medal (United States)
Recipients of the Distinguished Flying Cross (United States)
Recipients of the Meritorious Service Medal (United States)
Recipients of the Air Medal